Xenocide (1991) is a science fiction novel by American writer Orson Scott Card, the third book in the Ender's Game series. It was nominated for both the Hugo and Locus Awards for Best Novel in 1992. The title is a combination of 'xeno-', meaning alien, and '-cide', referring to the act of killing, together meaning the act of killing populations of aliens; comparable to genocide.

Plot summary

On Lusitania, Ender finds a world where humans and pequeninos and the Hive Queen could all live together. However, Lusitania also harbors the descolada, a virus that kills all humans it infects, but which the pequeninos require in order to become adults. The Starways Congress so fears the effects of the descolada, should it escape from Lusitania, that they have ordered the destruction of the entire planet, and all who live there. With the Fleet on its way, a second xenocide seems inevitable.

Lusitania
Following the events of Speaker for the Dead, a group of characters are depicted living as members of a Brazilian Catholic human colony on Lusitania, a unique planet inhabited by the only other two known species of sentient alien life: the Pequeninos "little ones" and the Hive Queen. The pequeninos are native to the planet, while the Hive Queen was transplanted to this world by Ender, partly in penance for his near-total destruction of her Formic species in Ender's Game.

After the rebellion of the small human colony on Lusitania in Speaker for the Dead to protect the future of the intelligent alien species, Starways Congress sends a fleet to Lusitania to regain control, which will take several decades to reach its destination. Valentine Wiggin, under her pseudonym Demosthenes, publishes a series of articles revealing the presence of the "Little Doctor" planet-annihilating weapon on the Fleet. Demosthenes calls it the "Second Xenocide," as using the weapon will result in the obliteration of the only known intelligent alien life. She also claims it to be a brutal crackdown of any colony world striving for autonomy from Starways Congress. Public anger spreads through humanity, and rebellions nearly ensue on several colonies.

After quelling much public discontent, Starways Congress finishes their analysis of the situation while the fleet is en route. Fearing the Descolada virus, further rebellions by colony worlds, and other possible unknown political motives, Starways Congress attempts to relay an order to the fleet to annihilate Lusitania upon arrival. After conferring with friends on whether a cause is worth dying for, Jane (a compassionate AI living in the interstellar ansible communication network) shuts off transmissions to the fleet to block the order. As a consequence of this action, she risks her eventual discovery and death, should the government shut down and wipe the interplanetary network. No known smaller computer system can house her consciousness.

On Lusitania itself, Ender attempts to find solutions to the looming catastrophes of the Congressional fleet, Descolada virus, and conflicts among the humans and intelligent alien species. Much on Lusitania centers around the Ribeira family, including Ender's wife Novinha and her children.  Novinha and Elanora, the mother-daughter team responsible for most of the biological advances countering the complex Descolada virus, are unsure if they can manufacture a harmless replacement virus. Conflicts arise on whether they should even do so, since the Descolada is intrinsically tied in with the life cycles of all Lusitanian organisms and may even be sentient itself. In addition, to try to devise methods to escape the planet, Lusitania's leading, troublemaking physicist Grego is persuaded by Ender to research faster-than-light travel, despite Grego scoffing at the idea. The third biologista of the family, Quara, is convinced that the Descolada is an intelligent, self-aware species, and deserves attempts from the humans for communication and preservation.  An additional sibling and Catholic priest, Quim (Father Estevão), is determined to use faith and theology to head off another form of xenocide: a group of warmongering Pequenino who wish to wipe out all Earthborn life via starship, carrying the deadly Descolada within them.

World of Path
Starways Congress wants its fleet back. After all else fails, it sends the dilemma of the fleet's impossible disappearance to several citizens of the world of Path, a cultural planetary enclave modeled on early China.  Path's culture centers on the godspoken – those who hear the voices of the gods in the form of irresistible compulsions, and are capable of significantly superior intelligence. It later becomes clear that the godspoken of Path are victims of a cruel government project: granted great intelligence by genetic modification, they were also shackled with a form of obsessive-compulsive disorder to control their loyalty.  The experiment is set in a culture bound by five dictates – obey the gods, honor the ancestors, love the people, serve the rulers, then serve your self. This is a further safeguard against rebellion. The superintelligent godspoken are considered the most devout and holy of all citizens, and any disloyal thoughts in a godspoken's mind are immediately suppressed by overwhelming obsessive-compulsive behavior, believed to be a sign from the gods the thoughts are wrong. The most respected godspoken on Path is Han Fei-Tzu, for devising a treaty to prevent the rebellion of several colony worlds after the articles published by Demosthenes. Great things are expected of his daughter and potential successor Han Qing-jao, "Gloriously Bright". While doubting the existence of the gods himself, Han Fei-Tzu promised his dying wife he would raise Qing-jao with an unwavering belief in the godspoken. The two of them are tasked by Starways Congress with deciphering the disappearance of the Lusitania Fleet. Han Qing-jao's secret maid, Si Wang-mu, aids her in this task, her intelligence (partially) unfettered by the rigid caste system.

The young and naive Qing-jao eventually traces the identity of Demosthenes.  Discovering that Demosthenes is Valentine Wiggin, Ender's sister – but that Valentine has been on a starship en route to Lusitania for the last thirty years – Qing-Jao concludes that the only possible explanation is advanced computer software closely tied to the communication network. This software must be hiding Demosthenes and publishing her work, while also causing the disappearance of the Fleet. All but discovered, Jane reveals herself to Han Fei-tzu, Han Qing-jao and Si Wang-mu, telling them about their genetic slavery and begging forbearance on their report to Starways Congress.

Already harboring suspicions about the godspoken's condition, Han Fei-tzu accepts the news of Congress's atrocity, as does Si Wang-mu, but his daughter Han Qing-jao clings to her belief that Demosthenes and Jane are enemies of the gods. Feeling betrayed by her father, who is violently incapacitated by OCD from the disloyal thoughts, Qing-jao argues with Jane. Jane threatens shutting off all communications from Path, but Si Wang-mu realizes this would eventually lead to the planet's destruction by Starways Congress. Understanding Jane to be truly alive and compassionate, through tears Si Wang-mu states Jane will not block the report. However, Qing-jao compares Jane to the servants in Path's caste system, merely a computer program designed to serve humans, containing neither autonomy nor awareness.

Knowing she has exhausted her last possibilities of stopping Qing-jao, Jane sacrifices her future and life, unwilling to bring harm to Qing-jao or the people of Path. A triumphant Qing-jao reports the knowledge of Demosthenes, Jane, and the fate of the Fleet to Starways Congress. Qing-jao recommends a coordinated date set several months from the present, to prepare the massive undertaking of setting up clean computers across the interplanetary network, after which the transition to a new system will kill Jane and allow Congress full control again. Allowing the message to be sent, Jane restores communication with the Fleet, and Congress re-issues the order for the Fleet to obliterate Lusitania.

Han Fei-tzu recovers from the incapacitation of his OCD, despairing over his daughter's actions, and his unwitting aid in deeply brainwashing her to serve Congress. He and Si Wang-mu assist Jane and those on Lusitania in finding solutions to their impending catastrophes. Planter, a Pequenino on Lusitania, offers his life for an experiment to determine whether the Descolada gives Pequeninos sentience, or if they have the ability innately. Eventually, Elanora Ribeira is able to come up with a possible model for a "recolada": a refit of the Descolada that allows the native life to survive and retain self-awareness, but doesn't seek to kill all other life forms. With the available equipment, however, the recolada is impossible to make, and they are running out of time against the soon-to-arrive Fleet.

Outside
While this research takes place, tragedies occur on Lusitania. Father Estevão Ribeira, the priest attempting to sway a distant warmongering sect of the Pequeninos from their goal of attacking humanity, is killed by the Fathertree Warmaker, who took Quim hostage and denied him the food with the anti-descolada chemicals, so the descolada infected and killed him on the 7th day of being hostage. Grego Ribeira spurs a riot of humans to burn down the warmaker's forest, but the violent mob gets out of his control, and rampages through the neighboring Pequenino forest instead, massacring many of its inhabitants – the original friends and allies of humanity. Under the terms of the treaty with Pequeninos, the Hive Queen is brought in to hold the peace, setting a perimeter guard of hive drones around the human colony and preventing further escalation of violence between the two groups. Grego is locked in jail, despite eventually stepping between the surviving Pequeninos and his own riot. The town realizes their horrific rage, and constructs a chapel surrounding the fallen priest's grave, trying to find penance for their actions.

Finally, a breakthrough is made. Knowing the Ansible communication network allows instantaneous transfer of information, and through knowledge of how the Hive Queen gives sentience to child queens, Jane, Grego, and Olhado discover the "Outside". The Outside is a spacetime plane where aiúas initially exist. (Aiúa is the term given to the pattern defining any specific structure of the universe, whether a particular atom, a star, or a sentient consciousness.) Formic hive queens are called from Outside after birth, giving awareness to the new body. Jane is able to contain within her vast computing power the pattern defining the billions of atoms and overall structure comprising a simple "starship" (little more than a room), with passengers included, and take them Outside. By bringing them Outside, where relative location is nonexistent, then back "Inside" at a different spot in the physical universe, instantaneous travel has been achieved, finally matching the instantaneous communication of the Ansibles and Formics. They quickly arrange to take Ender, Ela, and Miro to Outside. While Ela is Outside, she is able to create the recolada virus, which is a safe replacement of the descolada, and a cure to the godspoken genetic defect.  Miro envisions his body as it was before he was crippled by paralysis, and upon arrival in the Outside, his consciousness is contained within a new, restored body.  Ender discovers, however, the surreal unwitting creation of a new "Valentine" and new "Peter Wiggin" from his subconscious, who embody idealized forms of his altruistic and power-hungry sides.

The recolada begins its spread across Lusitania, converting the formerly lethal virus into a harmless aid to native life. The cure to the people of Path's genetic-controlling defect is distributed, yet Han Fei-tzu is tragically unable to convince his daughter Qing-jao this was the true course of action. Confronted with the possibility of being lied to all her life and dooming many sentient species to destruction, or an alternative of believing all she ever loved and trusted has betrayed her – Demosthenes, her father, her friend, her world – Qing-jao instead continues her godspoken rite of woodgrain tracing until her death and is honored by those on Path who still believe in the gods as the last true godspoken. She is elevated to god status after her death. Si Wang-mu sets off with Peter to take control over Starways Congress to stop the Fleet closing in on Lusitania. The new Valentine-persona journeys to find a planet to which the population of Lusitania can evacuate. The stage is set for the final book of the four-part series, Children of the Mind.

Reception
Xenocide was nominated for the 1992 Hugo Award for best novel.  As of 2022 it has a rating of 3.8 out of 5 on Goodreads with nearly 150,000 votes.

Connection to "Gloriously Bright"
Parts of "Gloriously Bright" from the January 1991 issue of Analog Science Fiction and Fact are republished in Xenocide as parts of Chapters 1, 3, 5, 7, 9, and 11.

See also
 List of Ender's Game characters
 List of works by Orson Scott Card

References

External links

 About the novel Xenocide from Card's website
 

1991 American novels
1991 science fiction novels
American science fiction novels
Ender's Game series books
Tor Books books
Fiction set in the 6th millennium
Novels about obsessive–compulsive disorder